The Voice: Frank Sinatra, the Columbia Years is a 1986 four-disc compilation album of the U.S. singer Frank Sinatra.

Track listing

disc 1:

 The Nearness of You
 If I Had You
 Nevertheless
 You Go to My Head
 My Melancholy Baby
 How Deep Is the Ocean?
 Embraceable You
 She's Funny That Way (I Got a Woman Crazy for Me)
 For Every Man There's a Woman
 I Don't Know Why (I Just Do)
 Someone to Watch Over Me
 Love Me
 There's No Business Like Show-Business
 The Song Is You
 September Song
 Oh, What a Beautiful Morning
 They Say It's Wonderful
 Bess, Oh Where Is My Bess?

disc 2:

 Saturday Night (Is the Loneliest Night in the Week)
 Poinciana
 Try a Little Tenderness
 Autumn in New York
 April in Paris
 Dream
 Nancy (With the Laughing Face)
 Put Your Dreams Away
 I'm Glad There Is You
 Day by Day
 Close to You
 I'm a Fool to Want You
 Where or When
 I Could Write a Book
 Why Was I Born?
 Lost in the Stars
 All the Things You Are
 Ol' Man River

disc 3:

 Should I?
 Birth of the Blues
 Mean to Me
 It All Depends on You
 Deep Night
 Sweet Lorraine
 Castle Rock
 Why Can't You Behave?
 My Blue Heaven
 S'posin'
 You Can Take My Word for It, Baby
 Blue Skies
 The Continental
 It's the Same Old Dream
 Laura
 Stormy Weather
 I've Got a Crush on You
 The House I Live In

disc 4:

 One for My Baby
 I Should Care
 These Foolish Things
 I Guess I'll Have to Dream the Rest
 It Never Entered My Mind
 When Your Lover Has Gone
 Body and Soul
 That Old Feeling
 I Don't Stand a Ghost of a Chance with You
 There's No You
 Guess I'll Hang My Tears Out to Dry
 Why Try to Change Me Now?
 All Through the Day
 I Couldn't Sleep a Wink Last Night
 Time After Time
 But Beautiful
 I Fall in Love Too Easily
 The Brooklyn Bridge

1986 compilation albums
Frank Sinatra compilation albums